The 11th World Science Fiction Convention (Worldcon), also known as Philcon II, was held on 5–7 September 1953 at the Bellevue-Stratford Hotel in Philadelphia, Pennsylvania, United States. It was the first Worldcon to present the Hugo Awards.

The supporting organization was the Philadelphia Science Fiction Society. The chairman was Milton A. Rothman, replacing the late James A. Williams.

Participants 

Attendance was approximately 750.

Guests of Honor 

 Willy Ley
 Isaac Asimov (toastmaster)

Awards

1953 Hugo Awards 

This Worldcon was the first one that awarded Hugo Awards. The next one (the 12th) did not do so, but since the 13th, Hugo Awards have been a permanent fixture of Worldcons.

 Best Novel: The Demolished Man, by Alfred Bester (Galaxy January, February, March 1952; Shasta, 1951)
 Best Professional Magazine: (tie)
 Astounding Science Fiction, edited by John W. Campbell, Jr.
 Galaxy Science Fiction, edited by H. L. Gold
 Best Cover Artist: (tie)
 Hannes Bok
 Ed Emshwiller
 Best Interior Illustrator: Virgil Finlay
 Excellence in Fact Articles: Willy Ley
 Best New SF Author or Artist: Philip José Farmer
 #1 Fan Personality: Forrest J. Ackerman

See also 

 Hugo Award
 Science fiction
 Speculative fiction
 World Science Fiction Society
 Worldcon

References 

1953 conferences
1953 in Pennsylvania
Science fiction conventions in the United States
Worldcon